Jonathon Michael Tremellen (born 30 October 1965) is a former Welsh cricketer.  Tremellen was a right-handed batsman who bowled right-arm medium pace.  He was born in Pendine, Carmarthenshire.

While studying at Cambridge University, Tremellen made his first-class debut for Cambridge University Cricket Club against Hampshire in 1986.  He made eleven further first-class appearances for the university, the last of which came against Surrey in 1988.  In his twelve first-class matches, he scored 269 runs at an average of 15.82, with a high score of 39.  With the ball, he took 2 wickets at an expensive bowling average of 112.00, with best figures of 1/13.

In 1988, he made his debut for Wales Minor Counties, making his debut for the county in the Minor Counties Championship against Cornwall.  He made four further appearances for the team in that season.

References

External links
Michael Tremellen at ESPNcricinfo
Michael Tremellen at CricketArchive

1965 births
Living people
Alumni of the University of Cambridge
Cambridge University cricketers
Cricketers from Carmarthenshire
Wales National County cricketers
Welsh cricketers